Chris Mulhall (born 9 February 1988) is an Irish footballer.

Career

Shelbourne
Portlaoise native Mulhall began his senior career with Shelbourne where he became a prominent figure in their Under 21 panel for two seasons. In 2006 Mulhall was capped twice for the Republic of Ireland at U18 level in two friendlies against Malta. Following Shelbourne's demotion to the League of Ireland First Division Mulhall was promoted to Shelbourne's first team squad. He made his Shelbourne debut on 16 March 2007 in a 2–1 loss to Finn Harps at Finn Park. This would turn out to be his only first team appearance for Shelbourne.

Shamrock Rovers
Mulhall departed Shelbourne in the summer of 2007 when he joined Shamrock Rovers. He made his senior debut for Shamrock Rovers on 5 October 2007 against Cork City and made 6 appearances during the remainder of the 2007 season for Rovers. A series of injuries hampered Mulhall's development during the following season where he was unable to make a single first team appearance for Shamrock Rovers.

UCD
Mulhall was released by Shamrock Rovers following the 2008 season but he immediately signed for UCD ahead of the Student's First Division campaign in 2009. Mulhall overcame his injury problems the previous season to make 34 appearances and score 7 goals in all competitions for UCD as the Students took the First Division title and automatic promotion. He remained with UCD for their 2010 Premier Division campaign making 36 apps and scoring 4 goals in total while helping UCD to a respectable 7th-place finish. Mulhall also helped UCD to the 2010 A Championship title following their 2–1 victory over Bohemians A on 1 November 2010.

Return to Shelbourne
Following cutbacks at UCD ahead of the 2011 season Mulhall became a free agent. On 14 December 2010, Mulhall returned to Shelbourne ahead of the 2011 First Division season.

UCD & Limerick F.C.
After a second spell with UCD which included playing in the Europa League qualifying rounds, Mulhall made his first move out of the capital to sign for Limerick F.C. on 1 December 2015. He played an important role in his first season at Limerick and earned a league winner's medal as the club returned to the top flight as 2016 first division champions. With the signing of Rodrigo Tosi however, Mulhall found his first-team opportunities limited in 2017 and left the club mid-season.

Drogheda United
Mulhall then joined struggling Premier Division side Drogheda United, but was unable to help the club turn their fortunes round, and Drogheda were relegated at the end of the season.

Longford Town
Following the brief stint at Drogheda, Mulhall signed for Longford Town in November 2017 ahead of the 2018 season.

Career statistics

Honours
UCD
League of Ireland First Division (1): 2009
League of Ireland A Championship (1): 2010

Limerick
League of Ireland First Division (1): 2016

References

External links

1988 births
Living people
People from Portlaoise
Association footballers from County Laois
Association football midfielders
Republic of Ireland association footballers
League of Ireland players
Shelbourne F.C. players
Shamrock Rovers F.C. players
University College Dublin A.F.C. players
Limerick F.C. players
A Championship players